James Unaipon, born James Ngunaitponi, (c. 1835 – 1907) was an Australian Indigenous preacher of the Warrawaldie (also spelt Waruwaldi) Lakalinyeri of the Ngarrindjeri.

Born James Ngunaitponi, he took the name James Reid in honour of the Scottish Free Church minister who baptised him. As James Reid he was sponsored by the Aborigines' Friends' Association for training as a missionary at the Point McLeay Mission on the banks of Lake Alexandrina in the Coorong region of South Australia in 1865. After arriving at Point McLeay from his home in Wellington, Unaipon returned to using his birth name of Ngunaitponi however, the Europeans anglicised his name to Unaipon in correspondence.

On 27 July 1866 Unaipon married Nymbulda, the daughter of Pullum (King Peter) who was the Rupelle (misinterpreted as "King" by colonists) of the Ramindjeri. The Rev George Taplin assumed that the position of Rupelle was hereditary and widely promoted Nymbulda as a queen, believing that a missionary related to royalty would be more influential in converting the Ngarrindjeri. The Rupelle was in fact elected by the Indigenous Tendi (government) and conferred no additional status to his family.

Unaipon co-authored writings on the Ngarrindjeri language was the first Aboriginal deacon, and the father of renowned Australian inventor, David Unaipon.

Notes

Citations

Sources

1830s births
1907 deaths
Australian Protestant ministers and clergy
Ngarrindjeri people

Year of birth uncertain
Indigenous Australian clergy